Joseph LaBate (born April 16, 1993) is an American professional ice hockey player who is currently playing for the Chicago Wolves of the American Hockey League (AHL). He was selected 101st overall by the Vancouver Canucks in the 2011 NHL Entry Draft.

Playing career
LaBate played for the Academy of Holy Angels's men's ice hockey team in high school, tallying 58 points in 25 games.

After three seasons in high school hockey, the Vancouver Canucks used their fourth round pick, 101 overall, to select LaBate in the 2011 NHL Entry Draft. He soon moved on to college hockey, playing for the Wisconsin Badgers in the NCAA. LaBate shifted from wing to center in his junior season at Wisconsin and skated in all 37 games for the Badgers. He scored a career-high 11 goals with 11 assists and was -3 with 22 penalty minutes. After four seasons with the Wisconsin Badgers, he signed a contract with the Canucks. He was sent down to the Utica Comets, and posted his first professional career goal against the Lehigh Valley Phantoms after a gruesome fight with Samuel Morin. He participated in the Canucks 2016-17 preseason games, posting a goal, but was eventually sent down to the Comets. On November 21, he was recalled to the NHL for the first time in his career. He made his NHL debut two days later, on November 23, 2016, logging 5:55 minutes of ice time in a 4–1 victory over the Arizona Coyotes. He was reassigned to the Comets on December 11, after playing three games with the Canucks.

Following the 2017–18 season, and at the conclusion of his third full season within the Canucks organization, LaBate became a free agent after he was not tendered a qualifying offer by the club. On August 20, 2018, LaBate secured a one-year AHL contract with the Belleville Senators, affiliate of the Ottawa Senators.

Labate left the Belleville Senators following the 2020–21 season, his third year with the club, and continued his career in the AHL by signing a one-year contract with the Milwaukee Admirals on July 29, 2021. In the following 2021–22 season, LaBate added a veteran presence to the Admirals forward group, adding 5 goals and 12 points through 56 regular season games. He appeared in a career-high 9 playoff games, adding 2 points.

As a free agent from the Admirals, LaBate was signed to a one-year contract with defending Calder Cup champions, the Chicago Wolves, on July 18, 2022.

Playing style
LaBate described himself as:
I would say that I am somewhere in the middle at this point of my career. But I am honestly putting a large emphasis on becoming a more physical player. I am working on the physical aspect of the game, and watching David Backes [who I referred to as a player that he has been compared to] play, you can tell that he plays with a physical edge on the ice. That's something that I'm trying to incorporate into my game. I skated with Ryan Malone this past summer, and I have started watching more of his stuff as well.

Career statistics

References

External links
 
 

1993 births
Living people
Belleville Senators players
Milwaukee Admirals players
Ice hockey players from Minnesota
People from Eagan, Minnesota
Twitch (service) streamers
Utica Comets players
Vancouver Canucks draft picks
Vancouver Canucks players
Wisconsin Badgers men's ice hockey players
American men's ice hockey centers